Cleobury North is a civil parish in Shropshire, England.  It contains three listed buildings that are recorded in the National Heritage List for England.  Of these, one is listed at Grade II*, the middle of the three grades, and the others are at Grade II, the lowest grade.  The parish contains the village of Cleobury North and the surrounding countryside.  The listed buildings consist of a church, the war memorial in  the churchyard, and the nearby rectory.


Key

Buildings

References

Citations

Sources

Lists of buildings and structures in Shropshire